Gwynedd is a large rural county in North Wales. The northern half includes the high mountains of Snowdonia and the mixed farmland and hills of the Lleyn peninsula, which between them make up the former county of Caernarvonshire. The southern part of Gwynedd is the softer coastal and upland landscapes of the former county of Merionethshire. Gwynedd, the second largest county in Wales, has a total of 497 Scheduled monuments. That is too many to have on a single list article, so for convenience the list is divided into three.  The 365 prehistoric sites are in two lists, covering 171 sites in former Merionethshire, and 194 sites in former Caernarvonshire. Below are the 132 sites dating from Roman to modern times, from the whole of Gwynedd. Gwynedd is a unitary authority comprising most of two historic counties. In 1974 it also merged with Anglesey, and the merged county was also called Gwynedd. Since 1996 Anglesey has been a separate county again.

There are 16 Roman scheduled sites on the list, almost all of which relate either to Roman military activity, or local defensive measures. By contrast, the 14 early medieval (Dark Age) monuments are all individual stones, either with carved crosses or other inscriptions or in one case a sundial. The 53 post-Norman medieval sites include sites included in the Castles and Town Walls of King Edward in Gwynedd World Heritage Site. Seven castles, 11 mottes, and seven enclosures are scheduled, as well as deserted settlements, two abbeys, five chapels and two holy wells. The 49 post-medieval sites include ten bridges, various sites relating to quarries, mines, engine houses, and railways, and five World War II defences.

The northern prehistoric sites are listed at List of prehistoric scheduled monuments in Gwynedd (former Caernarvonshire)

The southern prehistoric sites are listed at List of prehistoric scheduled monuments in Gwynedd (former Merionethshire)

Scheduled monuments have statutory protection.  It is illegal to disturb the ground surface or any standing remains. The compilation of the list is undertaken by Cadw Welsh Historic Monuments, which is an executive agency of the National Assembly of Wales. The list of scheduled monuments below is supplied by Cadw with additional material from RCAHMW and Gwynedd Archaeological Trust.

Roman to modern scheduled monuments in Gwynedd

See also
List of Cadw properties
List of castles in Wales
List of hill forts in Wales
Historic houses in Wales
List of monastic houses in Wales
List of museums in Wales
List of Roman villas in Wales

References
Coflein is the online database of RCAHMW: Royal Commission on the Ancient and Historical Monuments of Wales, GAT is the Gwynedd Archaeological Trust, Cadw is the Welsh Historic Monuments Agency

Gwynedd
Buildings and structures in Gwynedd